Edison Michael Flores Peralta (born 14 May 1994), is a Peruvian professional footballer who plays as a winger for Liga MX club Atlas and the Peru national team.

Flores began his career with Lima Universitario de Deportes. In 2011, at the age of 17, he won the U-20 Copa Libertadores and was named best player of the tournament.

With the national team, he participated at the 2018 FIFA World Cup and played at two Copa América tournaments: the Centenario and Brazil 2019, the latter of which he helped finish runners-up. Having scored 14 goals in 59 appearances, Flores is Peru's third active top goalscorer.

Club career

Universitario de Deportes
Flores made his official league debut in the Torneo Descentralizado on 31 July 2011 in an away match against Juan Aurich for round 16 of the 2011 season, at the age of 17. He entered the match in the 64th minute for Andy Polo, and the final result was 1–0 in favor of the Chiclayo based club. Later in match day 23 he played in his first Peruvian Clásico in the Descentralizado on 24 September 2011 at home in the Monumental. At the time of the derby Alianza Lima was in first place in the league. He entered the match in the 68th minute for Miguel Angel Torres when the score was tied at 1–1. Then in 92nd minute of the derby, Flores dribbled past three Alianza Lima players and provide the pass that led to Martin Morel's winning goal. The derby finished in a 2–1 win for Universitario.

Villareal
On 31 August 2012, Flores was announced as the new signing for Villarreal's reserve team, Villarreal B.

AaB/Aalborg BK
On 11 August 2016, Flores move to Danish-side AaB was confirmed. After interest from Belgian, Dutch and Spanish sides, Flores signed a 4-year deal. On 28 August 2016, he scored his first goal in the Danish Superliga, as he provided the equalizing goal in a 2–1-win against Aarhus Gymnastikforening.

Morelia

D.C. United 
On 14 January 2020, D.C. United acquired Flores paying a club-record $5 million transfer fee. Flores debuted on 29 February 2020, in a 1–2 loss against the Colorado Rapids.  In late August, Flores suffered a head-on-head collision and was out 6 weeks to repair facial fractures. He returned from his injury on 11 October 2020, in a 1–2 loss against the Chicago Fire. On 1 November 2020, Flores contributed his first assists for the team, providing two in a 3–4 loss against the New England Revolution. Flores finished D.C. United's disappointing 2020 season with 13 appearances and three assists.

Flores scored his first MLS goal on 13 May 2021, securing a 1–0 win over the Chicago Fire. On 23 May, Flores suffered a hamstring injury during a match against the Philadelphia Union, which he returned from in mid-August.

International career
He had played for all youth level of Peru, and was part of U-20 squad in the 2013 South American Youth Football Championship, where he left a great mark in his career. In the final match against U-20 Chile, which Peru had to win and eliminate Chile to qualify for 2013 FIFA U-20 World Cup, he scored from a header to put Peru a lead. However, his side could not protect this advantage because of a superb free kick from Bryan Rabello which levelled the game. It eventually ended 1–1 and Chile qualified at the expense of Peru, but Flores' performance impressed then-manager Sergio Markarián and he was called to the senior squad for the first time in perpetration for the friendly against South Korea and the remaining matches of 2014 World Cup qualifying, but he only made his debut in the friendly against South Korea. Peru's failures to qualify for both U-20 and senior World Cup had been a dark mark on his career and he became less used.

Under Ricardo Gareca, he was mostly ignored and not included in the final 23 of Peruvian squad for the 2015 Copa América held in Chile. After the competition, his performance at the national league got attracted to Gareca and subsequently, Flores was summoned by Gareca for the Copa América Centenario held in the United States. He left a great landmark in the team on his maiden major competition debut, scoring one goal against Ecuador in a 2–2 draw. Although he didn't score other goal than the one he netted to Ecuador, he helped Peru to top the group and eliminated Brazil in process. His impressive performance made him a new star of Peru and he was frequently selected for Peru's remaining 2018 World Cup campaign, where he laid history in helping Peru to qualify for the World Cup after 36 years absent.

In May 2018, he was named in Peru's provisional 23 man squad for the 2018 World Cup in Russia.
In Peru's second game during the 2019 Copa America, he scored a goal in the 3–1 victory over Bolivia. In the quarterfinals, he scored the winning penalty against Uruguay in the penalty shootout, and sent his team to the semifinals. He scored the first goal against Chile in the semi finals to send Peru into the finals against Brazil.

Personal life
On 21 December 2019, he married his long time girlfriend Ana Siucho in a televised wedding.

He is of African and Quechua origins and, alongside teammate Renato Tapia, have been working to promote the indigenous culture of Peruvian Quechua people.

Career statistics

Club

International

International goals
As of match played 1 February 2022. Peru score listed first, score column indicates score after each Flores goal.

Honours
Club Universitario de Deportes
U-20 Copa Libertadores: 2011
Peruvian Primera División: Apertura 2016

Individual
U-20 Copa Libertadores Best Player: 2011

References

External links

1994 births
Living people
Footballers from Lima
Peruvian footballers
Peruvian expatriate footballers
Club Universitario de Deportes footballers
Peruvian Primera División players
Villarreal CF B players
Segunda División B players
AaB Fodbold players
Danish Superliga players
Expatriate footballers in Spain
Peruvian expatriate sportspeople in Spain
Expatriate men's footballers in Denmark
Peruvian expatriate sportspeople in Denmark
Association football forwards
Peru international footballers
Copa América Centenario players
2018 FIFA World Cup players
Atlético Morelia players
2019 Copa América players
D.C. United players
Designated Players (MLS)
Major League Soccer players
Peruvian people of African descent
Peruvian people of Quechua descent